Or HaNer (lit. Light of the Candle) is a kibbutz in southern Israel. Located near Sderot, it fall under the jurisdiction of Sha'ar HaNegev Regional Council.

Etymology
Its name is taken from the Sanhedrin tractate of the Babylonian Talmud.

History
Or HaNer was established in 1955–57 as a farm belonging to the Yitzur UFitu'ah company. The founders were from the gar'in of the Gordoniya, Dror and HeHalutz movements, most of whom were immigrants from Argentina and Chile. Many of them originally came from the kibbutz Giv'ot Zaid.

The kibbutz was founded on the land belonging to the  depopulated Palestinian  village of Najd, northeast of the Najd village site.

In 2016, U.S. Under Secretary of State for Political Affairs, Thomas A. Shannon Jr. visited the  kibbutz and received a tour of the kibbutz factory, Ornit. Ornit, established in 1975,  manufactures blind rivets.

References

Argentine-Jewish culture in Israel
Chilean diaspora in Israel
Kibbutzim
Kibbutz Movement
Populated places established in 1957
Gaza envelope
Populated places in Southern District (Israel)
1957 establishments in Israel